Steve Collins is an American physicist and engineer best known for his role in NASA Mars exploration program.

Education and early-life 
Collins earned degrees in physics and theater arts from the University of California Santa Cruz He is the son of Emmy winning cinematographer Bob Collins best known for his work on Superman and Miami Vice.

Career 
Collins worked in the motion picture industry for a few years after graduation before being hired by NASA's Jet Propulsion Laboratory.  He has worked on the Psyche, Deep Impact and Deep Space One missions on attitude, guidance and control. He worked as team lead on the Mars Exploration Program. Collins served as senior guidance and control engineer on the Mars Science Laboratory mission.  Collins long hair along with Bobak Ferdowsi's mohawk, also drew attention as a new face of NASA.

Outside of NASA, Collins acts in community theater including a part in a musical Star Trek parody presented by the Caltech theater arts department. He also plays for JPL's employee soccer team, The Cosmics, and races autocross.

References 

American engineers
Jet Propulsion Laboratory
Living people
University of California, Santa Cruz alumni
21st-century American physicists
Year of birth missing (living people)